Egill Knutzen (28 April 1914 – 6 March 1990) was a Norwegian épée fencer. He competed at the 1936, 1948 and 1952 Summer Olympics.

Awards
   Swedish Fencing Federation Royal Medal of Merit in gold (Svenska fäktförbundets kungliga förtjänstmedalj i guld) (1986)

References

External links
 

1914 births
1990 deaths
Norwegian male épée fencers
Olympic fencers of Norway
Fencers at the 1936 Summer Olympics
Fencers at the 1948 Summer Olympics
Fencers at the 1952 Summer Olympics
Sportspeople from Oslo
20th-century Norwegian people